The Central District of Golbahar County is a district (bakhsh) in Golbahar County, Razavi Khorasan Province, Iran. At the 2006 census, its population was 34,556, in 8,800 families.  The district has two cities Golmakan and Shahr Jadid-e Golbahar.  The district has two rural districts (dehestan): Bizaki Rural District and Golmakan Rural District.

References 

Districts of Razavi Khorasan Province
Chenaran County